The Hundred of Dublin is a cadastral unit of hundred located on the northern Adelaide Plains of South Australia spanning the township of Dublin and surrounds. It is one of the eight hundreds of the County of Gawler. It was proclaimed in 1856 by Governor Anthony Musgrave and named by Governor Richard Graves MacDonnell after Dublin, Ireland, where he was born.

The following localities and towns of the Adelaide Plains Council area are situated inside (or largely inside) the bounds of the Hundred of Dublin:
 Dublin
 Thompson Beach
 Webb Beach
 Parham
 Windsor
 Calomba
 Wild Horse Plains (southern half)
 Long Plains (southern half)

See also
 District Council of Dublin
 Lands administrative divisions of South Australia

References

Dublin
1856 establishments in Australia